Calvin Presbyterian Church is a Presbyterian Church in Canada congregation in the Deer Park area of Toronto, Ontario, Canada. The church building is located at 26 Delisle Avenue, close to Yonge Street and St. Clair Avenue.

History 
The congregation began as a "Minority Group" from nearby Deer Park Presbyterian Church (subsequently Deer Park United Church) that voted against joining the United Church of Canada in 1925. First known as "Hill District Presbyterians", they later named their congregation after Reformation leader John Calvin. The church building was designed in 1926 by the firm of Wickson and Gregg.

Calvin Presbyterian is part of the Churches on the Hill group, an ecumenical association of congregations, including Deer Park United, that meet regularly for study, fellowship, and local pursuits.

Senior Ministers
 The Rev. Dr. Joseph Wasson, 1926–1955
 The Rev. Dr. Douglas Herron, 1956–1985
 The Rev. Dr. Kendrick Borden, 1987–2000
 The Rev. Ian A.R. McDonald, 2002–c. 2011
 The Rev. Dr. Emily Bisset, 2012–present

Music facility 

Musicians and recording engineers value the unique reverberation pattern of the Calvin Presbyterian sanctuary, with its similarity to the Sofiensaal in Vienna.

References

External links 
 
 Calvin Presbyterian Church website

Presbyterian churches in Toronto
20th-century Presbyterian church buildings in Canada